Louis Phélypeaux (1672–1725), marquis de La Vrillière, was a French statesman.

He succeeded his father Balthazar Phélypeaux as minister for the "so-called Reformed religion", that is with responsibility for Huguenots in 1700. In 1715, when the Regent forced Phélypeaux's kinsman Jérôme Phélypeaux to resign his ministries in favour of Jérôme's son Jean Frédéric, Phélypeaux became acting head of the Department of the Maison du Roi and of Navy Ministry. He exercised control of the ministries from 1715 to 1718 when Jean-Frédéric took effective office.

He was succeeded as minister for Huguenot matters by his son, Louis.

He married Françoise de Mailly-Nesle (1688–1742) in 1700. They had four children:

 Anne-Marie (1702–1716)
 Marie-Jeanne (1704–1793) who married her kinsman Jean Frédéric, comte de Maurepas, in 1718.
 Louis (1705–1777), comte de Saint-Florentin, marquis (1725) and (1770) duc de La Vrillière
 Louise-Françoise (1707–1737) who married Louis de Bréhan de Plélo (1699–1734), French Ambassador to Denmark.

See also
 Louis Phélypeaux (disambiguation)
 Phélypeaux

1672 births
1725 deaths
18th-century French people
17th-century French people
People of the Regency of Philippe d'Orléans
People of the Ancien Régime
French politicians
Marquesses of La Vrillière